The Close Islands are a cluster of about three small islands lying in the western part of the entrance to Buchanan Bay, Antarctica. They were discovered by the Australasian Antarctic Expedition (1911–14) under Douglas Mawson, who named the group for John H. Close, a member of the expedition.

See also 
 List of Antarctic and sub-Antarctic islands

References
 

Islands of George V Land